This article is a summary of 1981 in Australian television.

Events

Television
15 February - Channel Nine Celebrates 25 Years Of Television, hosted by Bert Newton
2 March - Network Ten introduces its new breakfast TV show, Good Morning Australia, marking the return of breakfast television to Australian television screens.
30 March - British sitcom To the Manor Born debuts on ABC.
10 April - The TV Week Logie Awards air on Network Ten for the first time.
23 May - Nine Network premieres a brand new sports program called Wide World of Sports.
27 July - Wheel of Fortune premieres on the Seven Network, hosted by Ernie Sigley with Adriana Xenides.
29 July - The Wedding of Charles, Prince of Wales, and Lady Diana Spencer is broadcast across ABC and almost every commercial channel in Australia.
16 September - The Nine Network celebrates 25 years of television in Australia.
12 November - Final episode of the Australia soap opera The Restless Years airs on Network Ten.
15 November - The Nine Network premieres its Sunday morning political current affairs program Sunday, hosted by Jim Waley.
23 November - A Country Practice debuts on Seven Network.
December - After a two year-battle, Rupert Murdoch's News Limited finally gains control of the Melbourne headquarters of Network Ten after appealing the decision by the Australian Broadcasting Tribunal which blocked the takeover.

Debuts

New International Programming
 4 February -  Knots Landing (Seven Network)
 10 February -  Buck Rogers in the 25th Century (Nine Network)
 14 February -  Freebie and the Bean (Network Ten)
 21 February/26 June -  Here's Boomer (21 February: Seven Network - Sydney, 26 June: Seven Network - Melbourne)
 4 March -  Worzel Gummidge (ABC)
 4 March -  Leatherstocking Tales (ABC)
 8 March -  To Serve Them All My Days (ABC)
 14 March/7 May -  The Sandbaggers (14 March: Nine Network - Sydney, 7 May: Nine Network - Melbourne)
 30 March -  To the Manor Born (ABC)
 30 April -  The Enigma Files (ABC)
 4 May -  Monkey (ABC)
 12 May - / Drak Pack (Seven Network)
 15 May -  Romie-0 and Julie-8 (Seven Network)
 22 May -  The Devil and Daniel Mouse (Seven Network)
 30 May -  Magnum, P.I. (Network Ten)
 5 June -  Matt and Jenny (ABC)
 20 June -  Yes Minister (ABC)
 15 July -  Jukes of Piccadilly (ABC)
 8 August -  Richie Rich (Nine Network)
 24 August -  Walt Disney's Mickey and Donald (Seven Network)
 26 August -  The Swish of the Curtain (ABC)
 2 September -  Arthur C. Clarke's Mysterious World (Nine Network)
 7 September -  Wayne and Shuster (ABC)
 7 October -  God's Wonderful Railway (ABC)
 22 October - / Tenko (ABC)
 27 October -  Huckleberry Finn and His Friends (Seven Network)
 18 November -  It's a Living (Nine Network)
 18 November -  Ladies' Man (Nine Network)
 20 November -  Goodtime Girls (Network Ten)
 13 December -  A Connecticut Rabbit in King Arthur's Court (Network Ten - Melbourne)
 21 December -  How Bugs Bunny Won the West (Network Ten)
 23 December -  A Cosmic Christmas (ABC)
 31 December -  Hi-De-Hi! (ABC)

Changes to network affiliation
This is a list of programs which made their premiere on an Australian television network that had previously premiered on another Australian television network. The networks involved in the switch of allegiances are predominantly both free-to-air networks or both subscription television networks. Programs that have their free-to-air/subscription television premiere, after previously premiering on the opposite platform (free-to air to subscription/subscription to free-to air) are not included. In some cases, programs may still air on the original television network. This occurs predominantly with programs shared between subscription television networks.

International

Television shows

1950s
 Mr. Squiggle and Friends (1959–1999)

1960s
 Four Corners (1961–present)

1970s
 Hey Hey It's Saturday (1971–1999, 2009–2010)
 Young Talent Time (1971–1988)
 Countdown (1974–1987)
 The Don Lane Show (1975–1983)
 60 Minutes (1979–present)
 Prisoner (1979–1986)

1980s
 Sale of the Century (1980–2001)
 Kingswood Country (1980–1984)
 Wheel of Fortune (1981–2008)
 A Town Like Alice, mini-series produced by Network Seven.

Ending this year

Returning this year

TV movies

See also
 1981 in Australia
 List of Australian films of 1981

References